John Prosky (born 1962) is an American film, theatre, and television actor.

Career 
Prosky's numerous TV credits include NYPD Blue, ER, Heroes, Criminal Minds, True Blood, JAG, My So-Called Life, Star Trek: Deep Space Nine, The Practice, The X-Files, The West Wing, Charmed, 24, House, Grey's Anatomy, Veronica Mars, Just Shoot Me!, Fringe, and the web series Red Bird. His film credits include The Nutty Professor, Bowfinger, and A.I. Artificial Intelligence. Prosky also contributed voice work to the L.A. Noire video game.

Personal life 
Prosky is the son of actor Robert Prosky. He has been married to actress Kimiko Gelman since 2000.

Filmography

Film

Television

References

External links

American male television actors
American male film actors
21st-century American male actors
American people of Slavic descent
Living people
Place of birth missing (living people)
1962 births